Trevor Ziemann (born 15 August 1945) is a South African cricketer. He played in six first-class matches for Border in 1967/68.

See also
 List of Border representative cricketers

References

External links
 

1945 births
Living people
South African cricketers
Border cricketers
Cricketers from East London, Eastern Cape